St Albans Abbey railway station in St Albans, Hertfordshire, England is about  south of the city centre in the St Stephen's area. It is the terminus of the Abbey Line from Watford Junction, operated by London Northwestern Railway. It is one of two stations in St Albans, the other being the much larger and busier St Albans City.

The unstaffed station consists of a single open-air platform and a car park. Improvement works were carried out in 2008.

It was the second UK railway station to receive a Harrington Hump to improve accessibility.

History

St Albans Abbey was the first railway station in St Albans, built by the London and North Western Railway in 1858.  It was, as it is now, a terminus; the company's plans to extend northwards to Luton and Dunstable never materialised.  Although the Midland Railway opened their station (St Albans City) in 1868, it was not until 1924 that "Abbey" was added to the station's title to avoid confusion – by this stage, both stations were owned by the London, Midland and Scottish Railway.

Until November 2007 responsibility for the branch line was with Silverlink.

Restoration of the passing loop at Bricket Wood was being considered by the local authorities and Network Rail but was turned down in early 2008; this would have facilitated trains running every 30 minutes. The passing loop proposal was being reconsidered in 2020 as part of the UK government’s £500-million 'Restoring Your Railway Fund' to re-open many of the lines and stations that were closed in the 1960s.

Branch to Hatfield 
This line closed to passengers in 1951. Goods services were withdrawn from the end of 1968 and the track was lifted. In the mid-1980s, the route was opened as a cycle path, now the Alban Way. The remains of the branch can be seen to the left of the single platform when looking down the line in the direction of Watford Junction, including overgrown remnants of the second platform which would have served the branch.

Station masters

Frederick Facer 1858  – 1866
R. Butler 1866 - 1867
Edward Orchard 1867 – 1875 (afterwards station master at Kings Langley)
Andrew Dunleary 1875 – ???? (formerly station master at King’s Langley)
Mr. Welton ???? – 1890 (afterwards station master at Aylesbury)
F. Butcher 1890 – 1893 (afterwards station master at Atherstone)
W.B. Holder 1893 – 1895 (afterwards station master at Newport Pagnall)
Mr. Smerdon 1895 – 1896 (formerly station master at Stanmore)
William Telfer 1896 – 1905 (afterwards station master at Buxton)
Henry Orchard 1905 – 1912 (afterwards station master at Harrow Junction)

Accidents and incidents
On 10 February 1988, a diesel multiple unit overran the buffer stop. There were no injuries amongst the seventeen passengers on board.

Services
All services at St Albans Abbey are operated by London Northwestern Railway. Services are typically operated using  EMUs.

References

Sources 
 
 
 Abbeyline.org.uk
 The Alban Way

External links

Transport in St Albans
Railway stations in Hertfordshire
Former London and North Western Railway stations
Railway stations in Great Britain opened in 1858
Railway stations served by West Midlands Trains